Ragnhild Male Hartviksen (born 15 July 1976) is a Norwegian politician.

She was elected deputy representative to the Storting from the constituency of Akershus for the period 2021–2025, for the Labour  Party. She replaced  Anniken Huitfeldt in the Storting from 2021 while  Huitfeldt is government minister.

Hartviksen hails from Spikkestad, and has been member of the municipal council of Asker since 2019. She is educated from the University of Oslo, and has worked for the municipality of Drammen.

References

1976 births
Living people
People from Røyken
University of Oslo alumni
Labour Party (Norway) politicians
Members of the Storting